Almas Shaukat (born 12 December 1995) is an Indian cricketer who plays for Uttar Pradesh. He made his first-class debut on 1 October 2015 in the 2015–16 Ranji Trophy. He made his List A debut on 8 December 2021, for Uttar Pradesh in the 2021–22 Vijay Hazare Trophy.

References

External links
 

1995 births
Living people
Indian cricketers
Uttar Pradesh cricketers
People from Kanpur